Leonid Viktorovich Korotkov (born January 19, 1965) was the governor of Amur Oblast in the Russian Far East. He was born in Zavitinsk. He graduated from Far Eastern University in 1987. He was a member of the Communist Party of Russia. He became governor in 2001, when he defeated the incumbent Anatoly Belonogov in a runoff. He had been a distant second with only 20% of the vote in the first round, but the incumbent got less than 50% of the vote so Korotkov could participate in the runoff, which he narrowly won.

Political activity 
In February 2005, Korotkov was renominated by President Vladimir Putin and confirmed for a second term by the local Parliament. He was one of the first governors to be elected in this way, as a law abolishing direct election of governors and presidents of the Russian republics had just taken effect. Putin sacked Korotkov from his position on May 10, 2007 after he was charged with abuse of power, appointing the oblast's agriculture minister Alexander Nesterenko as acting governor. Putin later appointed Nikolai Kolesov as Amur oblast's governor. President Dmitry Medvedev sacked Kolesov in October 2008 when Putin's appointee faced charges of illegally building a country house in a nature reserve.

A court in Blagoveshchensk on 27 December 2010 acquitted Korotkov of the charges he had faced of raising electricity tariffs to illegally bankroll the local soccer team, buying vehicles at inflated prices and paying 16 million roubles (about $620,000) to a mining company for a controlling stake that was allegedly never transferred to the oblast government.

References 

1965 births
Living people
People from Amur Oblast
Communist Party of the Russian Federation members
Governors of Amur Oblast
Financial University under the Government of the Russian Federation alumni
Far Eastern Federal University alumni
Members of the Federation Council of Russia (1994–1996)
Second convocation members of the State Duma (Russian Federation)
Third convocation members of the State Duma (Russian Federation)